Ianculescu is a surname. Notable people with the surname include:

Adrian Ianculescu (born 1973), Romanian artistic gymnast
Alexandra Ianculescu (born 1991), Romanian-Canadian speed skater
Eugenia de Reuss Ianculescu (1866–1938), Romanian teacher, writer, and women's rights activist
Magda Ianculescu (1929–1995), Romanian operatic soprano and voice teacher

Romanian-language surnames